Adam Rahayaan is an Indonesian politician and incumbent mayor of Tual city since 2016. He became acting mayor at first on 2016 when the incumbent mayor, M. M. Tamher suddenly died and he as vice mayor took the office in accordance of the law. In 2018 when he decided to run as mayor by himself and elected. 

Adam also served as a member of parliament in Southeast Maluku Regency in 1999 and 2004. He is a member of the Prosperous Justice Party since 1999.

References 

Living people
1967 births
Indonesian Muslims
Mayors of places in Indonesia
Prosperous Justice Party politicians